Ali Baba Taj is an Urdu, Persian and Hazaragi poet,  based in Quetta, Pakistan. He is known for his use of nazm style in Urdu poetry. He received his Master's Degree in Persian language and literature from the University of Balochistan, Quetta in 2003. He has written several articles in Urdu and Persian regarding poetry and literature.

World Poetry Festival 
Ali Baba Taj represented Pakistan in the World Poetry Festival held in Kolkata, India in 2008. He also attended the second Daryanagar poetry fair at Cox's Bazar in Bangladesh in 2010.

Visits for Cultural and Peace mission 
Ali Baba Taj has visited India several times for academic and literary purposes. His aim on these visits is to foster love and peace in humankind, especially between the people of Pakistan and India. He has met with scholars, poets, writers and other social and peace activists during these peace missions.

Books 
 muthee mein kuch saansain <ref>" Reviews on Ali Baba Taj's book'" </ref> Urdu مٹھی میں کچھ سانسیں  Poems Book, published in 2007.
 translations of various verses of Mirza Bedil jahan e muaani'' جھان معنی بیدل.

See also 
 List of people from Quetta
 List of Urdu language poets
 List of Hazara people

References

External links 
 online Poetry of Ali Baba Taj
 Articles by Ali Baba Taj (Archived 2009-10-25)

1977 births
Living people
Pakistani poets
Urdu-language poets from Pakistan
Pakistani scholars
20th-century Persian-language writers
People from Quetta
Pakistani people of Hazara descent
Hazara writers
Hazara poets
21st-century Persian-language writers